Po Ju may refer to:

Caught in Trap, 2014 Chinese film
Peace Breaker (film), 2017 Chinese film